Salmacis or Salmakis was the name of a fountain or spring located in modern-day Bodrum, Turkey. According to some classical authors, the water had the reputation of making men effeminate and soft. Ovid famously recounts the myth in his story about Hermaphroditus and the nymph of the spring Salmacis.

History
Salmacis was a fountain, located near the Mausoleum of Halicarnassus. In classical times, it had:
the slanderous repute, for what reason I do not know, of making effeminate all who drink from it. It seems that the effeminacy of man is laid to the charge of the air or of the water; yet it is not these, but rather riches and wanton living, that are the cause of effeminacy. —Strabo Geography XIV.2.16

This was illustrated by Hellenic sculptors, who produced several works depicting a person of dual-gender. The power of the spring was rejected by other Romans, such as the architect Vitruvius
there is a mistaken idea that this spring infects those who drink of it... it cannot be that the water makes men effeminate. —Vitruvius De architectura 2.8.12

In Book IV of his poem Metamorphoses, Ovid recounts the myth of how the fountain came to be so in the story of the nymph Salmacis (after whom the fountain is, in this account, named), her attempted rape of Hermaphroditus, and his resultant change into an intersex being. Scholars such as Károly Kerényi have asserted that Ovid's account was not a classical one and that the story was in fact invented by him.

The Salmakis inscription
In 1995, the so-called 'Salmakis Inscription' was discovered by Turkish authorities on the promontory of Kaplan Kalesi, which juts out into the sea to the south-west of Bodrum harbour.

The inscription is a poem sixty lines long, partly damaged but mainly well preserved, and was cut into an ancient wall sometime during the Hellenistic period. It is written in elegiac verse and the general theme is one of civilization. The first lines form the poet's invocation of the goddess Aphrodite, early in Aphrodite's story we encounter her son Hermaphroditus and the water nymph Salmacis:

The inscription also contains a list of famous authors born in Halikarnassos. First on the list being the Greek historian Herodotos. It is now being housed in the Museum of Underwater Archaeology at Bodrum Castle.

Music
The progressive rock band Genesis tells the story in "The Fountain of Salmacis", a track from their  1971 album Nursery Cryme.

References

 The Salmakis Inscription - University of Southern Denmark

Further reading
 Santini, Marco. "BELLEROPHONTES, PEGASOS AND THE FOUNDATION OF HALIKARNASSOS. CONTRIBUTIONS TO THE STUDY OF THE SALMAKIS INSCRIPTION." Studi Classici E Orientali 63 (2017): 109-44. www.jstor.org/stable/26511131.

Fountains in Turkey
Ancient Greek geography
Nymphs
Society of ancient Greece